Danakosha Ling (previously known as Danakosha Finland or Nyingmapa-yhteisö) is a Finnish Buddhist association. It represents Nyingma lineage of Tibetan Buddhism and is placed in Jokioinen, Finland. 

Since 2005 the association has been registered as a religious community in Finland. In 2019 the association has 47 members. The spiritual leader of the association is Tulku Dakpa Rinpoche. The association is also a member of the Finnish Buddhist Union.

The association is one of the few Buddhist communities that has the right to perform marriage ceremonies.

References

External links 

 Homepage of Danakosha Ling

Buddhism in Finland